Greyhound therapy is a pejorative term used in the US health care system since the mid-1960s to refer to mental health authorities' buying a ticket on a Greyhound Lines bus to get rid of possible "troublemaker" patients.

The practice is still in use in certain mental-health circles.

Diesel therapy or motorcoach therapy are similar terms for the practice and are usually used pejoratively.

See also 
 Health care in the United States
 Penal transportation
 Homeless dumping
 Rawson-Neal Hospital

References 

Mental health in the United States